The 2013 Manitoba Scotties Tournament of Hearts, Manitoba's women's provincial curling championship, was held from January 23 to 27 at the Veterans Memorial Sport Complex in Stonewall, Manitoba. The winning Jennifer Jones team represented Manitoba at the 2013 Scotties Tournament of Hearts in Kingston, Ontario.

Qualification Process
Sixteen teams will qualify for the provincial tournament through several berths. The qualification process is as follows:

Teams

Round-robin standings
Final round-robin standings

Asham Black Group

Red Brick Red Group

Round-robin results

Draw 1
January 23, 8:30 AM
Montford 12-2 Norquay
Spencer 10-4 McCreanor
Jones 9-3 Park
Cameron 8-4 Harvey

Draw 2
January 23, 12:15 PM
Thurston 9-6 Menard
Kilgallen 7-3 Overton-Clapham
Carey 6-2 Fordyce
Robertson 8-1 Fallis

Draw 3
January 23, 4:00 PM
Jones 10-5 McCreanor
Cameron 5-3 Montford
Harvey 8-2 Norquay 
Spencer 9-4 Park

Draw 4
January 23, 8:15 PM
Kilgallen 7-6 Carey
Fallis 7-4 Thurston
Robertson 10-1 Menard
Fordyce 7-6 Overton-Clapham

Draw 5
January 24, 8:30 AM
Spencer 9-2 Cameron
Harvey 7-5 Park
Montford 11-2 McCreanor
Jones 13-1 Norquay

Draw 6
January 24, 12:15 PM
Fallis 8-5 Overton-Clapham
Robertson 9-6 Fordyce
Kilgallen 7-6 Thurston
Carey 7-6 Menard

Draw 7
January 24, 4:00 PM

Montford 10-3 Park
Jones 7-2 Cameron
Spencer 9-1 Norquay
Harvey 10-2 McCreanor

Draw 8
January 24, 7:45 PM

Thurston 8-1 Fordyce
Carey 9-3 Fallis
Overton-Clapham 8-3 Menard
Kilgallen 10-6 Robertson

Draw 9
January 25, 8:30 AM

Overton-Clapham 8-7 Robertson
Kilgallen 6-3 Menard
Fallis 7-5 Fordyce
Carey 9-2 Thurston

Draw 10
January 25, 12:15 PM

Spencer 11-9 Harvey
McCreanor 8-3 Norquay
Cameron 11-6 Park
Montford 6-5 Jones

Draw 11
January 25, 4:00 PM

Fordyce 10-7 Kilgallen
Thurston 11-3 Robertson
Overton-Clapham 8-5 Carey
Fallis 10-9 Menard

Draw 12
January 25, 8:15 PM

McCreanor 9-5 Park
Montford 6-5 Harvey
Jones 8-5 Spencer
Cameron 9-1 Norquay

Draw 13
January 26, 8:30 AM

Draw 14
January 26, 12:15 PM

Playoffs

B1 vs. R1
Saturday, January 26, 7:45 pm

B2 vs. R2
Saturday, January 26, 7:45 pm

Semifinal
Sunday, January 27, 9:30 am

Final
January 27, 1:30 PM

Qualifying Events

Scotties Berth Bonspiel
The 2013 Scotties Berth Bonspiel, presented by Monsanto, will take place from November 16 to 18, 2012. The event will qualify two teams into the provincial playdowns.

Regional Playdowns
Regional playdowns will take place from December 14 to 16, 2012 at various locations and will qualify a total of 11 teams to the provincial playdowns.

References

Manitoba
Curling in Manitoba
Manitoba Scotties Tournament of Hearts
Stonewall, Manitoba
2013 in Manitoba